Macalla regalis is a species of snout moth in the genus Macalla. It was described by E. Dukinfield Jones in 1912. It is found in Brazil and Peru.

References

Moths described in 1912
Epipaschiinae